Backbone.js is a JavaScript rich-client web app framework based on the model–view–controller design paradigm, intended to connect to an API over a RESTful JSON interface.  Backbone is known for being lightweight, as its only hard dependency is on one JavaScript library, Underscore.js, plus jQuery for use of the full library. It is designed for developing single-page web applications, and for keeping various parts of web applications (e.g. multiple clients and the server) synchronized. Backbone was created by Jeremy Ashkenas, who is also known for CoffeeScript and Underscore.js.

When handling the DOM Backbone.js adopts an imperative programming style, in contrast with a declarative programming style (common in AngularJS using data-attributes).
Trying to provide "the minimal set of data-structuring (models and collections) and user interface (views and URLs)", leaves to the developer the choice of extensions for enhanced functionality. For example, one can use nested views with Backbone Layout Manager or model-view binding with ReSTbasis.

Use

The following web applications are built with Backbone.js:
 500px Web
 Airbnb
 Diaspora
 Digg
 DocumentCloud
 Drupal 8
 Foursquare
 Grooveshark
 Groupon Now
Hearsay Systems Advisor Cloud
 Hulu
 NewsBlur
Nextcloud
 Openbravo Mobile (with Enyo).
 Pandora Radio
 ReSTbasis
 SoundCloud
 Strideapp
 Trello
 USA Today.com
 WordPress.com
verizon.com
 xTuple (with Enyo).

References

Further reading

External links

JavaScript libraries
Software using the MIT license
2010 software